Panama Buena Vista Union School District is a K-8 public school district in Bakersfield, California. The district has 23 schools, and serves Southwest Bakersfield.

References

External links
 

School districts in Kern County, California
School districts established in 1875
1875 establishments in California